Aldo Dorigo (born August 5, 1929) is an Italian former professional footballer who made 161 appearances in Serie A playing for Triestina, Internazionale and Alessandria.

References

1929 births
Living people
Footballers from Trieste
Italian footballers
Association football midfielders
U.S. Triestina Calcio 1918 players
Inter Milan players
U.S. Alessandria Calcio 1912 players
Serie A players